Mach and Daddy were a Panamanian reggaeton duo consisting of Pedro "Mach" Machore and Martin "Daddy" Machore.

The first single for which they were recognized, "La Botella" ("The Bottle"), charted throughout Latin America and hit #1 on the Billboard chart. Other popular singles included "La Juma" and "El Que Se Fue Pa Barranquilla".

The duo's concerts attracted as many as fifty thousand people. They toured and performed throughout Latin America and the United States.

Peter Machore is "Mach" and Martin Machore is "Daddy". They derived their musical muse from their father, singer and composer Armando Machore, who was a member of the group Calipso Panama.

History 
The duo formed in 2000, when they released "The Essence of Your Love." Their theme song "La Botella" was released in February 2005, and became a musical phenomenon on Panamanian radio. "La Botella"'s run to #1 dethroned  Shakira and Maná.
Mach and Daddy toured the U.S beginning in January 2006. "Conducting From Below" was produced by Universal Music Latino.

"Thank God" was released in 2008.

Killa Records
The duo joined friend and fellow  Panamaian singer Jr. Ranks to create Killa Records, where they worked to recruit and produce other musical artists in this genre. "Daily" and "Unforgettable" were the label's first releases.

Discography

References 

21st-century Panamanian male singers
21st-century Panamanian singers
Panamanian reggaeton musicians
Reggaeton duos
Year of birth missing (living people)
Living people